Poda may refer to:

Places
Poda Protected Area, Bulgaria
Poda, Gacko, Bosnia and Herzegovina
Poda, Jablanica, Bosnia and Herzegovina
Poda, Bijelo Polje, Montenegro
Poda (Sjenica), Serbia
Podë, Albania, a deserted village
Koh Poda or Poda Island, Thailand

People with the surname
Zylyftar Poda, Albanian leader of early 1800s
Nikolaus Poda von Neuhaus (1723–1798), Austrian entomologist
John Poda, politician from Ohio